Sphecotypus taprobanicus, is a species of spider of the genus Sphecotypus. It is endemic to Sri Lanka.

See also
 List of Corinnidae species

References

Spiders described in 1897
Corinnidae
Endemic fauna of Sri Lanka
Spiders of Asia